Radomír Heizer (born 23 November 1987) is a Slovak professional ice hockey player who currently plays for Nice hockey Côte d'Azur of the Ligue Magnus.

Heizer previously played in the Slovak Extraliga for HK Spišská Nová Ves, HC ’05 Banská Bystrica, HK Poprad and HK Martin. He also played in the Czech Extraliga for HC Karlovy Vary and the Metal Ligaen for the Herlev Eagles.

Career statistics

Regular season and playoffs

References

External links

1987 births
Living people
Les Aigles de Nice players
HC '05 Banská Bystrica players
HC Karlovy Vary players
Herlev Hornets players
HK Poprad players
HK Spišská Nová Ves players
MHC Martin players
People from Gelnica
Sportspeople from the Košice Region
Slovak ice hockey centres
Expatriate ice hockey players in Denmark
Expatriate ice hockey players in France
Slovak expatriate ice hockey players in the Czech Republic
Slovak expatriate sportspeople in France
Slovak expatriate sportspeople in Denmark